Poa caespitosa is a synonym for various grasses in the Poa genus.

Poa caespitosa (G. Forst.) Hook. ex Speg. – Poa flabellata
Poa caespitosa Poir. – Poa nemoralis
Poa caespitosa Sprengel – Poa cita
Poa caespitosa alpina F.Muell. – Poa gunnii
Poa caespitosa var. affinis (R.Br.) Benth. – Poa affinis
Poa caespitosa var. australis Benth. – Poa sieberiana
Poa caespitosa var. latifolia Benth. – Poa ensiformis
Poa caespitosa var. plebeia (R. Br.) Benth. – Poa poiformis
Poa caespitosa var. serpentum (Nees) Benth. – Poa porphyroclados
Poa caespitosa var. tenera (Hook.f.) Benth. – Poa tenera